Claus Marek (born 3 April 1954) is a German athlete. He competed in the men's decathlon at the 1976 Summer Olympics.

References

1954 births
Living people
Athletes (track and field) at the 1976 Summer Olympics
German decathletes
Olympic athletes of West Germany
Sportspeople from Bochum